Denis Bastick (born 8 May 1981) is a Gaelic footballer who plays for Templeogue Synge Street and, formerly, for the Dublin county team.

Biography
Bastick attended St. Josephs BNS Primary School in Terenure. Bastick's club side Templeogue Synge Street won promotion to the top league in Dublin football for 2007. Bastick was considered unlikely to feature in the 2007 league campaign for Dublin due to a cruciate knee injury. Bastick made his return to the inter-county scene in June 2007 by being named on the Dublin panel to Wicklow in the Leinster Junior Football Championship. Bastick won the Dublin Intermediate Football Championship with Templeogue Synge Street in 2008.

He was captain of the 2008 All-Ireland Junior Football winning Dublin team.

Bastick made his Championship debut for Dublin against Meath in June 2009. Bastick won the Leinster Senior Football Championship with Dublin in July 2011 at Croke Park against Wexford. Bastick won a previous title with Dublin in July 2009. Bastick won the All-Ireland Senior Football Championship with Dublin in September 2011 against Kerry at Croke Park.

In September 2015, Bastick won his third All-Ireland football title with Dublin after a 0–12 to 0–9 win in the final against Kerry. The week before the match his car had been stolen from the driveway, it was recovered towards the end of the week.

Bastick announced his retirement from inter-county football in November 2017.

Bastick was sent off after being issued with a straight red card shortly after taking to the field against Tyrone in the Gaelic Masters Association's 2022 All-Ireland Final.

Media career
In 2012, Bastick appeared on RTÉ reality show Franc's DIY Brides where he married his fiancé Jody Hannon at Carton House in December 2011.

He appeared on the 2019 series of the Irish edition of Dancing with the Stars.

Honours
Club
 Dublin Intermediate Football Championship (1): 2008

County
 Leinster Junior Football Championship (1): 2008
 All-Ireland Junior Football Championship (1): 2008
 National Football League (4): 2013, 2014, 2015, 2016
 Leinster Senior Football Championship (8): 2009, 2011, 2012, 2013, 2014, 2015, 2016, 2017
 All-Ireland Senior Football Championship (5): 2011, 2013, 2015, 2016, 2017

References

1981 births
Living people
DCU Gaelic footballers
Dublin inter-county Gaelic footballers
Participants in Irish reality television series
Sportspeople from South Dublin (county)
Templeogue Synge Street Gaelic footballers
Winners of five All-Ireland medals (Gaelic football)